The 1994 Maine Black Bears football team was an American football team that represented the University of Maine as a member of the Yankee Conference during the 1994 NCAA Division I-AA football season. In their second season under head coach Jack Cosgrove, the Black Bears compiled a 3–8 record (2–6 against conference opponents) and tied for last place in the New England Division of the Yankee Conference. Steve Knight and Todd Park were the team captains.

Schedule

References

Maine
Maine Black Bears football seasons
Maine Black Bears football